Zesius is a genus of butterflies in the family Lycaenidae.

Species
Zesius chrysomallus Hübner, 1821 - redspot
Zesius phaeomallus Hübner, [1819-1821] Type locality: "Suriname".

References

Theclinae
Lycaenidae genera
Taxa named by Jacob Hübner